Slobodan "Rica" Gordić (born 28 September 1937) is a Serbian former professional basketball player. He represented the Yugoslavia national basketball team internationally.

Playing career 
Gordić played for OKK Beograd during their so-called 'Golden Era' in the late 1950s and the first half of the 1960s in the Yugoslav First League. His teammates were Radivoj Korać, Miodrag Nikolić, Bogomir Rajković, Trajko Rajković and Milorad Erkić. OKK Beograd's coaches during that time were Borislav Stanković and Aleksandar Nikolić and sports director was Radomir Šaper. In that period they won four Yugoslav League championships and two Yugoslav Cups.

During the 1967–68 season, Gordić played for a French team JA Vichy led by Đorđe Andrijašević. In 1968, he went to Belgium where he played in their Basketball League.

National team career 
As a player for the Yugoslavia national basketball team Gordić has played from 1958 to 1965. He participated at the 1963 FIBA World Championship in Brazil, and four EuroBasket (1959 in Turkey, 1961 in Yugoslavia, 1963 in Poland and 1965 in Soviet Union) and two Summer Olympics (1960 in Rome and 1964 in Tokyo). Gordić won the silver medal at the 1963 World Championship, as well as two silver medals (1961, 1965) and a bronze medal (1963) at EuroBasket. Also, he won the gold medal at the 1959 Mediterranean Games in Lebanon.

Post-playing career 
On 1 October 1973, Gordić got employed at the Belgian supermarket chain GB in Brussels. He worked there until 1996.

Career achievements 
 Yugoslav League champion: 4 (with OKK Beograd: 1958, 1960, 1963 and 1964).
 Yugoslav Cup winner: 2 (with OKK Beograd: 1960, 1962).

References

External links
 Slobodan Gordic at sports-reference.com

1937 births
Living people
Basketball players from Čačak
Basketball players at the 1960 Summer Olympics
Basketball players at the 1964 Summer Olympics
Serbian men's basketball players
OKK Beograd players
Yugoslav men's basketball players
1963 FIBA World Championship players
Serbian expatriate basketball people in Belgium
Serbian expatriate basketball people in France
Competitors at the 1959 Mediterranean Games
Mediterranean Games gold medalists for Yugoslavia
Olympic basketball players of Yugoslavia
Mediterranean Games medalists in basketball
JA Vichy players